Pierre Michael Littbarski (born 16 April 1960) is a German professional football manager and former player of 1. FC Köln and the West Germany national team. Known for his dribbling abilities, he was mainly used as an attacking midfielder or winger. Littbarski was a FIFA World Cup winner with West Germany in 1990, and the runner-up in both 1982 and 1986. Littbarski was the caretaker manager of VfL Wolfsburg after taking over from Steve McClaren from 7 February to 17 March 2011.

Club career
Littbarski spent most of his playing career at 1. FC Köln. He made his debut for the club, at the time coached by Hennes Weisweiler, at the age of 18. The stars on the team during Littbarski's first few years were goalkeeper Harald Schumacher, goal scorer Dieter Müller, and midfielder Bernd Schuster. Littbarski scored the winning goal in the 1983 DFB-Pokal final against Fortuna Köln. He was on teams that were three times the runner-up in the Bundesliga title chase, in 1982, 1989 and 1990. In his career, he was initially used as a deep-lying striker before being utilised as an attacking midfielder. Playing in the former role, in the four seasons from 1981 to 1985 he scored 64 league goals in 128 Bundesliga games. "Litti", as he was nicknamed by German fans, was widely known for his excellent dribbling abilities and humorous attitude, and was one of the fan favourites in the West German Bundesliga during the decade. In 1985 his goal versus Werder Bremen was elected "Goal of the Year". He later played for RC Paris in Ligue 1 as well as for JEF United Ichihara and Brummel Sendai in Japan.

International career
Littbarski had a prolific but short career as part of the West German Under-21 side. He was a part of the squad that got to the 1982 UEFA European Under-21 Football Championship final. The team lost to England 5–4 after a two-leg final (losing 1–3 away and winning 3–2 at home). Littbarski scored a hat-trick against the English in West Germany, but ultimately they lost the tie.

Littbarski earned his first cap for West Germany on 14 October 1981 in the 1982 World Cup qualification against Austria. West Germany manager Jupp Derwall started him in a three-man front line alongside Klaus Fischer and Karl-Heinz Rummenigge. Littbarski's international career got off to a promising start, as he scored the first and second goals in that game. His third international goal came at the 1982 World Cup, in the second round match against Spain, a 2–1 victory. Against France in the semi-final, Littbarski scored the opening goal, and later was successful on a penalty in the deciding shoot-out. The now legendary match ended in a 3–3 draw, with Littbarski involved in the dramatic extra-time equalizer, crossing to Horst Hrubesch, who headed to Klaus Fischer, who scored with an overhead bicycle kick. Littbarski had minutes earlier provided the pass that Rummenigge scored from to cut France's lead to 3–2. A poignant scene in the penalty shootout showed the young Littbarski consoling a tearful Uli Stielike, who had just missed a penalty and had buried his head in Littbarski's shirt, while watching West Germany's goalkeeper, Harald Schumacher, save Didier Six's penalty to even the score. West Germany eventually won 5–4 on penalties. West Germany lost 3–1 to Italy in the final. Littbarski played the whole match, receiving a yellow card in the 88th minute.

He holds the record for the most player assists in a single World Cup tournament, with five assists in 1982 FIFA World Cup, alongside with Pelé (1970), Robert Gadocha (1974), Diego Maradona (1986) and Thomas Häßler (1994).

At the UEFA Euro 1984, West Germany, with Littbarski, were eliminated in the group stage after a string of poor performances. The 1986 FIFA World Cup in Mexico, while successful for West Germany, proved less so for Littbarski personally.  He was benched by manager Franz Beckenbauer, and had to watch the semi–final and final from the bench. West Germany again finished as runners–up, losing 3–2 to Argentina. In 1987, he played in a friendly match against England and scored two goals, one directly from a corner, as the West Germans won 3–1.

The West German players had high hopes for the UEFA Euro 1988 on their home soil. However, the hosts lost 2–1 to the Netherlands in the semi–finals. Littbarski did not score any goals in the tournament. In 1990, Littbarski enjoyed a successful final appearance at the FIFA World Cup, as West Germany won their third title, defeating Argentina 1–0 in the final in Rome. Littbarski scored his only goal in the group stage against Colombia but started three of the four games at the knockout stage, including the final.

Managerial career
In 1999, he started his coaching career with Yokohama FC of Japan Football League and he led the club to the promotion to J2 League.
He has also been the manager of Yokohama FC (twice), as well as assistant manager of Bayer 04 Leverkusen and manager of MSV Duisburg.

Sydney FC
He was manager of Australian A-League side Sydney FC between 2005 and 2006, and led them to the FIFA Club World Championship in 2005, and a win in the inaugural A-League Championship.

He was famous amongst Sydney FC supporters and the media for his stylish brown suits. Sydney under Littbarski were criticised for boring football, but the results could seldom be argued with and Sydney FC went on to claim the inaugural A-League Championship under his reign. Littbarski and Sydney FC severed ties on Wednesday, 5 May 2006, with Littbarski announcing he would not re-sign for the club following disputes over a cut-price contract offer.

Avispa Fukuoka
In December 2006, Littbarski was appointed the manager of Avispa Fukuoka, a J2 League side that was newly demoted to the second division after the 2006 season. In July 2008, he left the club and was replaced by Yoshiyuki Shinoda.

Saipa F.C.
On 26 July 2008, it was announced that he became the new manager of Iranian side Saipa F.C. His contract was terminated on 8 October 2008 after nine games.

FC Vaduz
On 4 November 2008 he signed a contract as head coach and team manager of FC Vaduz. On 12 April 2010 he was dismissed due to lack of success.

VfL Wolfsburg
On 9 June 2010, Littbarski signed a two-year contract as assistant coach by VfL Wolfsburg. After Steve McClaren was sacked on 7 February 2011, Littbarski was appointed caretaker manager of VfL Wolfsburg. Felix Magath was subsequently made head coach in March 2011.

Name
Littbarski has said that he was named "Pierre" because his parents loved France and, when thinking of a name for him, recalled their travels there.

Career statistics

Club

International

Scores and results list West Germany's goal tally first, score column indicates score after each Littbarski goal.

Managerial statistics

Honours
1. FC Köln
 DFB-Pokal: 1982–83
 UEFA Cup runner-up: 1985–86

Germany
 FIFA World Cup: 1990; runner-up: 1982, 1986

Individual
 kicker Bundesliga Team of the Season: 1981–82, 1984–85, 1989–90
 FIFA World Cup top assist provider: 1982
 Goal of the Year (Germany): 1985
 Sydney FC Hall of Fame: 2015

See also
Litti's Summer Sports, Game Boy video game endorsed by Pierre Littbarski

References

External links
 
 
 League matches of Pierre Littbarski season by season at RSSSF
 TSV Bayer 04 Leverkusen's Who's Who
 
 

1960 births
Expatriate footballers in Japan
Expatriate football managers in Japan
1. FC Köln players
1982 FIFA World Cup players
1986 FIFA World Cup players
1990 FIFA World Cup players
FIFA World Cup-winning players
Bundesliga players
German football managers
German expatriate footballers
German expatriate sportspeople in Australia
West German expatriate sportspeople in France
German expatriate sportspeople in Japan
German footballers
Germany international footballers
Germany under-21 international footballers
Germany B international footballers
JEF United Chiba players
J1 League players
Japan Football League (1992–1998) players
Ligue 1 players
Living people
Footballers from Berlin
Racing Club de France Football players
Sydney FC managers
UEFA Euro 1984 players
UEFA Euro 1988 players
Vegalta Sendai players
J2 League managers
Yokohama FC managers
Avispa Fukuoka managers
German expatriate sportspeople in Liechtenstein
MSV Duisburg managers
West German expatriate footballers
West German footballers
Expatriate soccer managers in Australia
Expatriate football managers in Switzerland
A-League Men managers
FC Vaduz managers
German expatriate sportspeople in Switzerland
Association football wingers